Lost Lake Cafe and Lounge is a diner in Seattle's Capitol Hill neighborhood, in the U.S. state of Washington.

Description 

Lost Lake Cafe and Lounge is a 3,000 square foot diner in Capitol Hill. In 2013, Bradley Foster of Thrillist wrote, "Inside, Lost Lake is stylishly lost in time, its space dominated by an old-school diner-style bar and clad in '60s-era decor ranging from faux wood paneling to chandeliers the Jetsons would love."

The breakfast menu, served all day, includes benedicts, fried chicken and buttermilk biscuits, pancakes, and vegan hash. Lunch and dinner options include meatloaf, sandwiches, tuna melts, and salads. The diner has also served skirt steak fajitas and eggnog French toast. For Thanksgiving, the diner has served  cider-brined turkey, honey-glazed ham, and vegetarian lasagna. For Christmas, Lost Lake has served crab bisque, turkey, and mulled wine with brandy.

History 
The restaurant opened in 2013. Lost Lake was operated by David Meinert and Jason Lajeunesse via Guild Seattle. Meinert sold his stake in 2018.

Reception 
Eater Seattle has included Lost Lake in lists of recommended eateries for Thanksgiving and Christmas, and for watching the Super Bowl. The website's Julia Wayne and Dylan Joffe included the diner in a 2017 list of "The Top Wi-Fi-Equipped Cafes to Work Remotely in Seattle".

See also
 List of diners
 List of New American restaurants

References

External links 

 

2013 establishments in Washington (state)
Capitol Hill, Seattle
Diners in Washington (state)
New American restaurants in Seattle
Restaurants established in 2013